Earl "Presto" Johnson was a vaudevillian-styled magician who performed extensively throughout New York for many years.

A short archived video clip of Earl was featured on the main page for Genii magazine during March 2012.

References

Archival footage 

Presto Johnson - Needle thru Balloon [YouTube] https://www.youtube.com/watch?v=sz3daASl5gQ

American magicians